Elia Hernández Núñez (20 June 1962 – 24 August 2021) was a Mexican politician from the National Action Party. From 2006 to 2009 she served as Deputy of the LX Legislature of the Mexican Congress representing Guanajuato.

References

1962 births
2021 deaths
Politicians from Guanajuato
Women members of the Chamber of Deputies (Mexico)
National Action Party (Mexico) politicians
21st-century Mexican politicians
21st-century Mexican women politicians
Members of the Chamber of Deputies (Mexico) for Guanajuato